Slippery is descriptive of slipperiness.

Slippery may also refer to:

Geography
Slippery Falls, a waterfall near Pelverata Falls, Tasmania
Slippery Rock Formation, a geologic formation in Jamaica

Arts, entertainment, and media
"Slippery" (song), 2017 song by Migos from their album Culture
Paul, Estelle, Rory, Daniel and Edwin Slippery, a fictional family in the 2003 British television series Fortysomething

Other uses
Operation Slippery, a planned deception in support of Operation Zipper, a British Second World War plan
Slippery hitch, a type of knot used to attach a line to a rod or bar
Slippery the Sea Lion, who escaped in June 1958 from a marine mammal park in London, Ontario, Canada

See also
Slippery Rock (disambiguation)
Slippery When Wet (disambiguation)
Slipperiness
Slippering